Visa requirements for South Ossetian citizens are administrative entry restrictions imposed on citizens of South Ossetia by the authorities of other states.

Passport Validity

Visa Requirements
South Ossetia has mutual visa-free agreements with Russia in 2010 and Abkhazia in 2015 among others. South Ossetians can either use their domestic or international passport to enter Russia and Abkhazia. South Ossetia and Venezuela are preparing to sign a mutual visa-free agreement.

See also
 Visa policy of South Ossetia
 South Ossetian passport
 List of citizenships refused entry to foreign states
 International recognition of Abkhazia and South Ossetia
 Foreign relations of South Ossetia

References

South Ossetia
Foreign relations of South Ossetia